The Bolshaya Synya (Komi: Ыджыд Сыняю), also known simply as Synya , is a river in the Komi Republic, Russia. The Synya Formation, a Middle Triassic geological formation, is named after the  Bolshaya Synya river.

The Synya flows across the Pechora Municipal District. The Pechora Railway crosses the river near Synya village. Part of the river basin falls within the limits of the Yugyd Va National Park, a protected area.

Course 
The Synya is a left tributary of the Usa, one of the main tributaries of the Pechora. It has its sources in the western slopes of the Subpolar Urals. The river heads in a roughly NNW direction as a mountain river in its upper reaches. In its middle and lower course its channel divides into branches as it flows within a wooded, swampy plain. In its last stretch there are many lakes in the plain to the west of the river.

Tributaries  
The river is frozen between October and May.

See also
List of rivers of Russia

References

External links
Исток р. Большая Сыня. Слияние р. Лунвож-Сыня и р. Войвож-Сыня.
Rivers of the Komi Republic
Pechora basin